José Antonio Pinto Castro (1817, San José – 26 February 1887) was a Costa Rican politician, son of General Antonio Pinto Soares and María del Rosario Castro Ramírez. He was married to Juana Samayoa y Leiva and graduated as attorney of law from the University of Guatemala. His brother José Concepción Pinto Castro was also a politician and lawyer.

He served as War Comptroller, Governor of San José Province, Secretary of Government and Police and Vice-president (then called First in Line to the Republic) from 1872 to 1873. He temporarily served as President from 1872 to January 1873 during President Tomás Guardia Gutiérrez' first trip to Europe.

He was named Magistrate of the Supreme Court of Costa Rica on 1880 and in 1886 became its president. He died as such on 26 February 1887 in San José.

1817 births
1887 deaths
People from San José, Costa Rica
Costa Rican people of Portuguese descent
Vice presidents of Costa Rica
Government ministers of Costa Rica
Supreme Court of Justice of Costa Rica judges